Katherine Godwin (January 16, 1917 – March 5, 2015) was the First Lady of Virginia from 1966 to 1970 and again from 1974 to 1978. She was born in Southampton County in 1917 and lost both parents to the 1918 flu epidemic. She graduated from Madison College in 1930 and taught elementary school in Chuckatuck, Virginia, before marrying Mills E. Godwin, Jr., in 1940. She died on March 5, 2015, in Williamsburg, Virginia, aged 98.

References

1917 births
2015 deaths
First Ladies and Gentlemen of Virginia
People from Southampton County, Virginia
James Madison University alumni
Schoolteachers from Virginia
American women educators
21st-century American women